Provincial Highway 10 (PH 10)is a short east–west highway that is entirely within the city limits of Taichung. The highway connects Port of Taichung with the northern suburbs of Qingshui, Shalu, Daya, Shengang, and Fengyuan.

The highway begins at Port of Taichung and continues towards downtown Qingshui as Sanmin Rd. (三民路). It is then known as Zhongqing Road (中清路) as it leaves Qingshui. The route then turns to a northeast direction at the intersection with PH 1B in Daya, the latter continues to central Taichung while the former goes to Shengang and Fengyuan as Minsheng Road (民生路) and Zhongzheng Road (中正路).

Spur routes
PH 10B (10乙) is the old segment of Highway 10 between Qingshui and Shalu. When Taichung Airport expanded, a new segment of PH 10 was built, and this segment was renamed PH 10B.

References

Highways in Taiwan